The ancient Egyptian noble Intefiqer (ỉnỉ-ỉt.f ỉqr) was overseer of the city and Vizier under Amenemhet I and Senusret I during the early 12th Dynasty (1991–1802 BC). He is known from several rock inscriptions in Lower Nubia, showing that he was part of a military mission into this region. He appears in an inscription found at the Red Sea coast and in the so-called Reisner Papyrus. Two rock inscriptions in Lower Nubia mention him. They seem to indicate that he was involved in a military campaign into this region. The inscriptions are not dated, but other inscriptions in the region seem to indicate a military campaign in year 29 of Amenemhet I, which corresponds to the 9th year of Senusret I. Intefiqer is also known from a stela found at Wadi el-Hudi, dated to year 20. It reports the bringing of amethyst. 

The tomb of his mother Senet in Thebes is in Sheikh Abd el-Qurna in the Theban Necropolis, opposite Luxor. Intefiqer was buried in a mastaba at Lisht, next to the pyramid of Amenemhet I.

References

Bibliography 
Norman de Garis Davies: The tomb of Antefoker, vizier of Sesostris I, and of his wife, Senet (no. 60), London 1920
Wolfram Grajetzki: Court Officials of the Egyptian Middle Kingdom, London 2009 p. 27-30 
 William Kelly Simpson: Rulers and Administrators - Dynasty 12, The Rule of the House of Itj-towy with Some Personal Reminiscenes, In: D. P. Silverman, W. K. Simpson, J. Wegner (Hrsg.): Archaism and Innovation: Studies in the Culture of Middle Kingdom Egypt, New Haven, Philadelphia 2009 S. 269-97 

Viziers of the Twelfth Dynasty of Egypt
Ancient Egyptian overseers of the city